Saint-Aubin-lès-Elbeuf (literally Saint-Aubin near Elbeuf) is a commune in the Seine-Maritime department in the Normandy region in northern France.

Geography
SNCF operates a TER railway service here.

Heraldry

Population

Places of interest

 The church of St. Aubin, dating from the fourteenth century.
 The seventeenth-century château of Mathonville.
 The ancient priory of Saint-Gilles.
 Several old houses.

Twin towns
Saint-Aubin-lès-Elbeuf is twinned with

 Karpniki, Poland 
 Pattensen, Germany
 Wilkszyn, Poland

See also
Communes of the Seine-Maritime department

References

External links

Official town website 

Communes of Seine-Maritime